Changle railway station may refer to:

 Changle railway station (Fujian) (长乐站)
 Changle railway station (Shandong) (昌乐站)

See also
 Changle East railway station, Fujian
 Changle South railway station, Fujian